Amazon Games (formerly Amazon Game Studios) is an American video game company and division of the online retailing company Amazon that primarily focuses on publishing video games developed within the company's development divisions.

History 
In 2011, Amazon opened the Amazon Appstore and started to hire developers for mobile social games. In 2012, Amazon Game Studios released Living Classics, a social game for Facebook.

Amazon first announced that it would create computer games in 2014. Amazon recruited Kim Swift (Portal, who has since left for Microsoft Games Studios), Clint Hocking (Far Cry 2), and developers who previously worked on System Shock 2. Amazon sought to make games in-between the industry standards of small and large teams making casual and AAA games, respectively. Amazon Game Studios wanted to make teams of five to thirty people who would work on games for between a year and 18 months with a focus on "creativity" and "craftsmanship", whether the genre is for kids or hardcore gamers. Studio vice-president Mike Frazzini wanted to make projects like Minecraft, The Walking Dead, and The Room. The studio also wanted developers to impact the direction of their hardware, between its cloud services and Amazon-brand devices. For example, developers can offload processing to Amazon's cloud services and the Amazon Fire TV has expanded memory as a result of developer feedback. A lot of the company's developers left within a year of the company's founding. Amazon Game Studios went on to publish a number of mobile titles, including the horror game Lost Within.

Two years after the studio's initial announcement, at the September 2016 TwitchCon, the studio revealed its first three PC games: Breakaway, Crucible, and New World. Breakaway was a team-based brawler in which two teams of four fight to deliver a ball to their opponents' goal. It was designed for tight integration into Twitch, the streaming service Amazon acquired in 2014. Amazon Game Studios announced the cancellation of Breakaway in March 2018. Crucible was a 12-player, class-based game in which players competed to become the last man standing. Crucible was launched in May 2020, but also cancelled later that year, with Relentless Studios citing "inability to see a sustained future" as the cause. New World is a massively multiplayer sandbox game with a supernatural colonial America theme. Players can form settlements, fight each other, or fight monsters out in the world. Crucible launched on May 20, 2020, while New World was released on September 28, 2021, after a 2nd pushback date was announced on July 10, 2020, and a 3rd on August 31, 2021. 

In August 2018, Christoph Hartmann, co-founder of video game publisher 2K Games – a wholly owned subsidiary of Take-Two Interactive – became the new Vice President of Amazon Game Studios working under Mike Frazzini.

In June 2019, during E3 week it was announced that layoffs hit the company. At this time it was unknown how many people were impacted. However, "multiple" unannounced projects had been cancelled.

The company had been involved with a The Lord of the Rings MMO with Leyou since the middle of 2019. However, in April 2021, following Tencent's purchase of Leyou in December 2020, contractual disputes between Amazon and Tencent led Amazon to cancel further development of the game.

The company has three game development studios in San Diego, Seattle, and Orange County. In March 2021, Amazon opened a new development studio in Montreal, Quebec, led by former members of Ubisoft Montreal behind Rainbow Six: Siege, Luc Bouchard, Xavier Marquis, Alexandre Remy, and Romain Rimokh.

During a major leak of Twitch's source code in October 2021, it was revealed that Amazon Games was working on a competitor to Steam, codenamed "Vapor".

New World launched on September 28, 2021, reaching 707,000 concurrent players at its peak on launch day.  Concurrent players on Steam peaked at just over 913K, putting it among the top 5 titles on the list of games with the most peak players ever for the platform. 

Lost Ark is a massively multiplayer online action role-playing game (MMOARPG) developed by Tripod Studio and Smilegate's game development subsidiary Smilegate RPG. It was fully released in the Korean region on December 4, 2018. The game was also released in North America, South America, and Europe on February 11, 2022, by Amazon Games. Within twenty-four hours of release, it became the second most played game on Steam.

On September 22, 2021, Amazon Games announced it will publish a new title from game developer Glowmade. Based in Guildford, England, Glowmade’s staff includes veterans of Lionhead Studios. This game for Amazon will be a new IP focusing on online cooperative play. 

In March 2022, studio head Mike Frazzini stepped down.

Games 
{| class="wikitable sortable" style="width:auto;"
|-
! Year
! Title
! Developer(s)
! Platform(s)
|-
! 2010
| Airport Mania: First Flight
| rowspan="2" | Reflexive EntertainmentSouth Wind Games
| rowspan="5" | Amazon Appstore
|-
! 2011
| Airport Mania 2: Wild Trips
|-
! rowspan="4" | 2012
| Air Patriots
| rowspan="3" | Reflexive Entertainment
|-
| Simplz: Zoo
|-
| Lucky's Escape
|-
| Living Classics
| rowspan="6" | Amazon Game Studios
| Facebook
|-
! rowspan="4" | 2014
| To-Fu Fury
| Amazon Appstore, iOS App Store
|-
| Tales From Deep Space
| Amazon Appstore
|-
| Sev Zero
| Amazon Appstore, Google Play, iOS App Store
|-
| The Unmaking
| Amazon Appstore
|-
! rowspan="2" | 2015
| Lost Within
| Amazon Appstore, iOS App Store
|-
| Til Morning's Light
| Amazon Game StudiosWayForward
| Amazon Appstore
|-
!| 2018
| Dragon's Lair
| Amazon Game Studios Seattle
|Twitch Extension
|-
!| 2019
| The Grand Tour Game
| Amazon Game Studios Seattle
|PlayStation 4, Xbox One
|-
! 2021
|New World
| Amazon Games Orange County, Relentless Studios
|Windows
|-
! 2022
|Lost Ark
| Smilegate RPG
|Windows
|-
! 2023
|Blue Protocol
| Bandai Namco Studios, Bandai Namco Online
|Windows, PlayStation 5, Xbox Series X/S
|-
! rowspan="4" |TBA
|Throne and Liberty
| NCSoft
|Windows, PlayStation 5, Xbox Series X/S, Google Play, iOS App Store
|-
|Untitled Tomb Raider project 
|Crystal Dynamics
|TBA
|-
|Unannounced project| Glowmade
|TBA
|-
|Unannounced project| Disruptive Games
|Windows, PlayStation 4, PlayStation 5, Xbox One, Xbox Series X/S
|-
! rowspan="5" |Cancelled
|Nova| rowspan="2" |Amazon Game Studios
|
|-
|Intensity|
|-
| Breakaway| Amazon Game Studios Orange County
|
|-
| Crucible|Relentless Studios
|Windows
|-
| Lord of the Rings MMO| Amazon Game Studios
|
|}

 Divisions 
Relentless Studios (formerly Amazon Game Studios Seattle) is an American video development studio based in Seattle, Washington. It is most known for developing the cancelled title Crucible in 2020.

Amazon Games Orange County (formerly Amazon Game Studios Orange County and Double Helix Games) is an American video development studio based in Irvine, California. It is most known for developing the title New World'' which was released in September 2021.

Amazon Games San Diego (formerly Amazon Game Studios San Diego) is an American video game development studio based in San Diego, California.

Amazon Games Montreal is a Canadian video game development studio based in Montreal, Quebec.

References

External links 
 

Amazon (company)
Video game companies established in 2014
Video game companies of the United States